"Can't Dance" is a song recorded by British singer Lisa Stansfield for her 2014 album, Seven. It was written by Stansfield and her husband Ian Devaney, and produced by Devaney and Jerry Hey. "Can't Dance" premiered on Ken Bruce's BBC Radio 2 show on 14 August 2013 and was digitally released as the first single on 16 October 2013. Stansfield performed the song live during her Seven Tour in 2013 and 2014. The remixes of "Can't Dance" premiered on SoundCloud on 22 January 2014. In October 2014, five remixes of "Can't Dance" by Moto Blanco, Snowboy and the Danish/German soul production duo Cool Million, were included on the re-release of Seven titled Seven+.

Track listings
Digital single
"Can't Dance" – 4:14

Promotional single
"Can't Dance" (Radio Mix) – 3:25
"Can't Dance" (Album Version Edit) – 4:16

Promotional single
"Can't Dance" (Radio Mix) – 3:41
"Can't Dance" (Album Version) – 4:15
"Can't Dance" (Moto Blanco Radio Edit) – 3:30
"Can't Dance" (Moto Blanco Club Mix) – 6:01
"Can't Dance" (Moto Blanco Instrumental) – 6:01
"Can't Dance" (Cool Million 81 Radio Edit) – 4:19
"Can't Dance" (Cool Million 81 Club Mix) – 6:17
"Can't Dance" (Cool Million 83 Remix) – 5:27
"Can't Dance" (Snowboy Vintage Funk Radio Edit) – 3:30
"Can't Dance" (Snowboy Vintage Funk Club Mix) – 5:32

Other remixes
"Can't Dance" (Snowboy Club Remix) – 4:48

Credits and personnel

Songwriting – Lisa Stansfield, Ian Devaney
Production – Ian Devaney, Jerry Hey
Mixing – Peter Mokran
Engineer – Stephen Boyce-Buckley, Steve Sykes, Cristiano Verado
Keyboards – Ian Devaney, Peter Mokran
Percussion – Snowboy
Guitars – Paul Jackson, Jr.
Drums – John Robinson
Bass – Neil Stubenhaus
Trumpets – Gary Grant, Dan Fornero
Trombones – Steve Haltman
Saxophones – Dan Higgins
Handclaps – Alice Bellasich, Ian Devaney, Mick Donnelly, Davide Givannini, Davide Mantovani, Dave Olivier, Snowboy
Horns arrangement – Jerry Hey
Vocals arrangement – Lisa Stansfield
Additional rhythm arrangement – Snowboy, Dave Olivier

Release history

References

Lisa Stansfield songs
2013 singles
2013 songs
Songs written by Lisa Stansfield
Songs written by Ian Devaney